Wienhold is a surname. Notable people with the surname include:

 Günter Wienhold (1948–2021), German footballer
 Lutz Wienhold (born 1965), German footballer

See also
 Weinhold